The Vega Formation is a Late Jurassic (Kimmeridgian) geologic formation of the Ribadesella Group in Asturias, Spain. Dinosaur remains diagnostic to the genus level are among the fossils that have been recovered from the formation. The formation is around 150 metres thick and consists of "alternating white, pale grey and reddish sandstones, and red mudstones with several sporadic conglomeratic beds typically arranged in minor finnig-upward cycles within a major cycle of the same character". An isolated caudal theropod vertebra and a partial tooth are known from the formation, belonging to large megalosaurids around 10 metres in length, comparable to Torvosaurus. Other remains known from the formation include fragmentary turtle remains, crocodylomorph teeth, as well as a sauropod caudal vertebra (MUJA-0650). Dinosaur tracks are also known from the formation, including large theropod footprints and poorly preserved quadrupedal dinosaur footprints.

Paleofauna 
 Megalosaurus sp. (Theropoda indet.)
 Stegosauria indet.
 Torvosaurus sp.? (Theropoda indet.) - "cervical vertebrae"

See also 
 List of dinosaur-bearing rock formations
 List of stratigraphic units with few dinosaur genera
 Lastres Formation, contemporaneous fossiliferous formation of Asturias

References

Bibliography 
 
  

Geologic formations of Spain
Jurassic System of Europe
Jurassic Spain
Kimmeridgian Stage
Ichnofossiliferous formations
Paleontology in Spain
Formations